Temoer Terry (born June 12, 1975 in McPherson, Kansas) is a former college wrestling champion.  Wrestling out of the University of Nebraska,
 (1994–1998), he had a collegiate record of 100-24.  Terry had a record of 79-3 at McPherson High School.  Terry has also coached at the college level for American University.  Also coached for George Mason University

Awards and highlights 
Is a member of the National Wrestling Hall of Fame in Stillwater, Oklahoma.
3 time All-American, 2 time Big 8 Champion, 1992 Jr. Greco Roman Nationals-4th, 1992 Jr. Greco Roman World Championships-4th,
1992 Greco Roman World Team Trials-Champion, 1991 Cadet Nationals-Doubles Champion, 7-time Southern Plains Regional Champion,
3-Time Kansas State H.S. Champion

Personal 
Lives mostly in Brazil and holds wrestling camps throughout the year.

External links

References 

American wrestlers
Living people
1975 births
People from McPherson, Kansas